The 1990 Dynasty Cup was a football competition for the top four teams of East Asia. The first edition of the Dynasty Cup was held from 27 July 1990 to 3 August 1990 in China. The competition was won by South Korea.

Participating teams

Squads

Results

Group stage

Final

References
1990 Dynasty Cup at Rsssf

1990
1990 in Asian football
1990 in Chinese football
1990 in Japanese football
1990 in South Korean football
1990 in North Korean football
1990